Röblinsee is a lake in the Mecklenburg Lake District, in Germany. It is situated in the district of Oberhavel in the state of Brandenburg, and lies immediately to the west of the town of Fürstenberg.

The navigable River Havel flows through the Röblinsee, entering it via a  channel from the Ziernsee. The river exits the lake through a short channel and lock in the centre of Fürstenberg, before entering the linked lakes of Baalensee and Schwedtsee. Navigation is administered as part of the Obere–Havel–Wasserstraße.

References 

Lakes of Brandenburg
Federal waterways in Germany